Italy competed at the 2013 World Championships in Athletics from 10 to 18 August in Moscow, Russia. On 23 July 2013 the President of the FIDAL Alfio Giomi announced during the event which took place in Agosto Azzurro in the main hall of CONI that 59 Italian athletes would participate in the world championships in Moscow.

Medalists

Finalists
Italy national athletics team ranked 19th (with only six finalist) in the IAAF placing table. Rank obtained by assigning eight points in the first place and so on to the eight finalists.

Details
Valeria Straneo, silver medal in the marathon
Elisa Rigaudo, 5th in the 20 km walk
Emma Quaglia, 6th in the marathon
Alessia Trost, 7th in the high jump
Nicola Vizzoni. 7th in the hammer throww
Fabrizio Schembri, 8th in the triple jump
4×400 metres relay female team, disqualified in final

Team selection

IAAF entry Standards, to be reach from 1 October 2012 to 29 July 2013 and from 1 January 2012 (10,000 m, Marathon, Race Walks,
Relays and Combined Events). In the following list all the qualified athletes to individual level, will be considered also the members of the relay team.

Athletes who have achieved the standard A

Men (27)

Women (21)

Athletes not selected
Athletes who have achieved the standard B or standard A but they did not participate.

(*): not selected.
(**): selected but renounces.

See also
 Athletics in Italy

References

External links
ATHLETES 14TH IAAF WORLD CHAMPIONSHIPS - COUNTRY ITALY

World Championships in Athletics
2013
Nations at the 2013 World Championships in Athletics